Jorge Cerdán Lara (23 July 1897 – 15 August 1958) was a Mexican attorney and politician who served as governor of the Mexican state of Veracruz from 1940–1944. He was a member of the Institutional Revolutionary Party (PRI).

See also
Governor of Veracruz

1897 births
1958 deaths
Politicians from Veracruz
Institutional Revolutionary Party politicians
Governors of Veracruz